The men's synchronized 3 metre springboard was one of eight diving events included in the Diving at the 2000 Summer Olympics programme and one of the newest four events since 1924.

The competition was held as a direct final:

Final 28 September — Each pair of divers performed five dives freely chosen from the five diving groups, with two dives limited to a 2.0 degree of difficulty and the others without limitation. Divers could perform different dives during the same dive if both presented the same difficulty degree. The final ranking was determined by the score attained by the pair after all five dives had been performed.

Results

References

Sources
 

Men
2000
Men's events at the 2000 Summer Olympics